The 2007 Medibank International men's doubles was the 2007 Medibank International men's doubles competition won by Paul Hanley and Kevin Ullyett.

Seeds

  Bob Bryan /  Mike Bryan (first round)
  Mark Knowles /  Daniel Nestor (final)
  Paul Hanley /  Kevin Ullyett (champions)
  Martin Damm /  Leander Paes (semifinals)

Draw

Draw

External links
Association of Tennis Professionals (ATP) draw

Men
Medibank International